Myzus boehmeriae, also known as Myzus (Myzus) boehmeriae, is an aphid in the superfamily Aphidoidea in the order Hemiptera. It is a true bug and sucks sap from plants.

References 

 http://www.cybertruffle.org.uk/cgi-bin/nome.pl?organism=156080&glo=eng

Agricultural pest insects
Macrosiphini